"Sunrise" is a song by Norwegian singer Alexandra Joner. The song was released in Norway on 4 May 2012 for digital download. The song features vocals from Norwegian dance/hip hop duo Madcon. The song entered the Norwegian Singles Chart at number eight.

Music video
A music video to accompany the release of "Sunrise" was first released onto YouTube on May 4, 2012 at a total length of three minutes and fifty-eight seconds.

Track listings

Chart performance

Release history

References

2012 singles
2012 songs
Universal Music Group singles